This is a list of South Dakota suffragists, suffrage groups and others associated with the cause of women's suffrage in South Dakota.

Groups 

 Aberdeen Equal Suffrage Club.
Athol Equal Suffrage Association, organized in 1890.
Bon Homme Universal Franchise League.
Brookings Equal Suffrage Association.
Brown County Equal Suffrage Association.
Codington County Men's Suffrage League.
Davison County Equal Suffrage Club.
Edmunds County Equal Suffrage Association.
Frankfort Equal Suffrage Association.
Grant County Equal Suffrage Association, formed in 1890.
Highmore Equal Suffrage Association.
Hurley Suffrage Association.
Lake County Universal Franchise League.
Minnehaha County Equal Suffrage Association.
Mitchell Woman Suffrage Club.
Onida Equal Suffrage Club.
Philip Suffrage Club, organized in 1910.
Pierre Political Equality Club.
Rapid City Suffrage Club.
Roberts County Suffrage Association.
Sioux Falls Franchise League.
South Dakota Equal Suffrage Association, founded in 1890.
 South Dakota Universal Franchise League, founded in 1911.
Spearfish Franchise League.
Sturgis Equal Suffrage League.
Union County Equal Suffrage Association, organized in 1897.
Watertown Universal Franchise League.
Woman's Christian Temperance Union.

Suffragists 

 Irene G. Adams (Webster).
Ida M. Anding (Pierre).
Rachel M. Ross Austin (Vermillion).
Blanche Pentecost Bagley (Sioux Falls).
William F. Bailey (Faulkton/Roanoke).
Helen M. Barker (Huron).
L. Frank Baum (Abderdeen).
Edith M. Beaumont (Madison).
Ellen J. Beach (Britton).
Elsie Lincoln Benedict (Deadwood).
Marium L. Bennett (Clark).
May B. Billinghurst (East Pierre).
Susie Bird (Fourche).
LoElla H. Blank (Wessington Springs).
Thomas Linus Blank (Wessington Springs).
Marietta Bones (Webster).
Mary Cummings Bonhamn.
Ruby Hine Booth (Spearfish).
Rose Bower (Rapid City).
Etta Estey Boyce (Sioux Falls).
Nellie Hough Bradley (Sturgis).
Marjorie Breeden (Pierre).
Jane Rooker Breeden (Pierre).
Mina E. Campbell (Sioux Falls).
Dora Cassem (Mitchell).
Emmer Cook (Huron).
Caroline Bartlett Crane (Sioux Falls).
Emma Amelia Cranmer (Ipswich/Huron/Aberdeen).
Simeon H. Cranmer (Ipswich/Huron/Aberdeen).
Alice Lorraine Daly (Madison).
John DeVoe.
Emma Smith DeVoe (Huron).
Mary A. Dilger (Rapid City).
Lorena King Fairbank (Huron).
Mary Ella Noyes Farr (Hot Springs, Pierre).
Hattie E. Fellows (Sioux Falls).
William Fielder.
Kate Uline Folger (Watertown).
May P. Ghrist (Miller).
Nana E. Gilbert (Salem).
Rebecca B. Hager (Madison/Aberdeen).
Nettie C. Hall (Wessington Springs).
Sophia M. Harden (Woonsocket/Huron).
Ruth B. Hipple (Pierre).
Florence Jeffries (Fort Pierre).
Philena Everett Johnson (Highmore).
Adeline Karcher (Pierre).
Marguerite Karcher-Sahr (Pierre).
Werdna Kellar (Lead).
Della Robinson King (Scotland).
Henrietta C. Lyman (Pierre).
Wilhelmina M. Oleson (Deadwood).
Nina D. Pettigrew (Spearfish/Belle Fourche).
 Alice M. Alt Pickler (Faulkton).
Katherine W. Powell (Custer/Spearfish).
Mamie Shields Pyle (Huron).
Luella A. Ramsey (Woonsocket).
Samuel A. Ramsey (Woonsocket).
Dorothy M. Rehfeld (Aberdeen).
Mabel Rewman (Deadwood).
Sarah A. Richards (Pukwana).
Martha A. Scott (Sioux Falls).
Minnie E. Sheldon (Sioux Falls).
Anna R. Simmons (Huron/Mitchell/Faulkton).
Jennie M. Taylor (Sioux Falls).
Mary Maguire Thomas.
Cicely J. Tinsley (Sioux Falls/Deadwood).
Jennie Walton (Huron).
Alonzo Wardall (Huron).
Elizabeth M. Wardall (Huron).
Myra P. Weller (Mitchell).
Elinor H. Whiting (Pierre).
Eliza Tupper Wilkes (Sioux Falls).

Politicians supporting women's suffrage 

 John T. Blakemore.
Frank M. Byrne.
R. F. Pettigrew.
John Pickler.
 Enos Stutsman.
Robert S. Vessey.

Suffragists campaigning in South Dakota 

 Jane Addams.
Beulah Amidon.
Susan B. Anthony.
Sarah Atkins.
Rachel Foster Avery.
Barton O. Aylesworth.
Helen LaReine Baker.
Louise G. Baldwin.
Adelaide Ballard.
Clara Barton.
Elsie Lincoln Benedict.
Alice Stone Blackwell.
Henry Browne Blackwell.
Mary C. C. Bradford.
Rachael Brill.
Olympia Brown.
Ulrikka F. Bruun.
Mary Baird Bryan.
Alice Snitzer Burke.
Carrie Chapman Catt.
Clara Bewick Colby.
Mary E. Craigie.
Stella Crossley.
Ida Crouch-Hazlett.
Emma Smith DeVoe (returns to campaign after moving away).
Marion H. Drake.
Julia Mills Dunn.
Emmy Carlsson Evald.
Susan S. Fessenden.
Antoinette Funk.
Matilda Joslyn Gage.
Omar E. Garwood.
Mary L. Geffs.
Helen M. Gougar.
Sara Green.
Laura A. Gregg.
Harriet Grim.
Mary Garrett Hay.
Matilda Hindman.
Clara Cleghorn Hoffman.
Mary Seymour Howell.
Laura M. Johns.
Effie McCollum Jones.
Rosalie Gardiner Jones.
Fola La Follette.
Lora La Mance.
Julia Lathrop.
Lena Morrow Lewis.
Mary Livermore.
Anna A. Maley.
Maud Leonard McCreery.
James T. McCrory.
Catharine Waugh McCulloch.
Maria S. McMahon.
Helen Guthrie Miller.
Josephine Miller.
Julia Bullard Nelson.
Anna Dickie Olesen.
Mabeth Hurd Paige.
Perle Penfield.
Liba Peshakova.
Mary Elizabeth Pidgeon.
Jane Pincus.
Helen G. Putnam.
Nell Richardson.
Anna Howard Shaw.
Lulu L. Shepard.
Nettie Rogers Shuler.
Ida M. Stadie.
Elizabeth Cady Stanton.
Rene E.H. Stevens.
Ella S. Stewart.
Sylvanus A. Stockwell.
Lucy Stone.
Ezra B. Taylor.
Anna Ursin.
Mabel Vernon.
Gertrude von Petzold.
Sena Hartzell Wallace.
Gertrude Watkins.
Marguerite Milton Wells.
Margaret Whittemore.

Publications 

 South Dakota Messenger.

Anti-suffragists 
Groups

 South Dakota Association Opposed to Woman Suffrage.

People
 Edward Dietrich.
Ethel Jacobsen (Pierre).
 Henry Schlichting (Deadwood).
Anti-suffragists campaigning in South Dakota

 Minnie Bronson.
 Charles McLean.
 Lucy Price.

See also 

 Timeline of women's suffrage in South Dakota
 Women's suffrage in South Dakota
 Women's suffrage in states of the United States
 Women's suffrage in the United States

References

Sources 

 

South Dakota suffrage

South Dakota suffragists
Activists from South Dakota
History of South Dakota
Suffragists